Rade Mihaljčić (21 January 1937 – 26 March 2020) was a Serbian historian and academic. Most of his works deal with medieval Serbia, especially the Serbian empire and the Battle of Kosovo.

Major works

Monographies:

 The Fall of the Serbian Empire (Kraj Srpskog carstva), 1975.
 Lazar Hrebeljanović - istorija, kult, predanje, 1984.
 Heroes of the Kosovo Legends (Junaci kosovske legende), 1989.
 The Battle of Kosovo in History and in Popular Tradition, 1989.
 Bezimeni junak, 1995.
 Boj na Kosovu u bugaršticama i epskim pesmama kratkog stiha, 1995, co-author with Jelka Ređep
 Prošlost i narodno sećanje, 1995; Srpska prošlost i narodno sećanje, 2001.
 Izvorna vrednost stare srpske građe, 2001.
 Vladarske titule oblasnih gospodara - prilog vladarskoj ideologiji u starijoj srpskoj prošlosti, 2001.
 Zakoni u starim srpskim ispravama, 2006.

Articles:

 Selišta. Prilog istoriji naselja u srednjovekovnoj srpskoj državi, Zbornik FF u Beogradu IX-1 (1967) 173–224.
 Gde se nalaѕio grad Petrus?, Prilozi KJIF 34, 3–4 (1968) 264–267.
 Bitka kod Aheloja, Zbornik FF u Beogradu XI-1 (1970) 271–275.
 Vojnički zakon, Zbornik FF u Beogradu XII-1 (1974) 305–309.
 Knez Lazar i obnova srpske države, O knezu Lazaru, Beograd 1975, 1–11.
 Stavilac, IČ HHIII (1976) 5–21.
 L‘État Serbe et l‘universalisme de la seconde Rome, Da Roma alla terza Roma, Roma, Constatinopoli, Mosca, Roma 1983, 375–386.
 Djed, Dmitar Zvinimir, Dorf, Lexikon des Mittelalters III-6, München 1985.
 Dabiša, Lexikon des Mittelalters III-7, München 1985.
 Drijeva, Lexikon des Mittelalters III-7, München 1985.
 Otroci, IG 1-2 (1986) 51–57.
 Lazar Hrebeljanović, Lexikon des Mittelalters V, München 1990.
 Istorijska podloga izreke „Od Kulina bana“, IG 1-2 (1992) 7–13.
 Vladarska titula gospodin, IG 1-2 (1994) 29–36.
 Kosovska legenda kao istorijski izvor, Godišnik na Sofiiski universitet „Sv. Kliment Ohridski“ 86–5 (1992–1993), Sofija 1995, 51–59.
 La corégence dans l’État des Nemanić, Σύμμεικτα 11 (Αθήνα 1997) 215–227.
 Prezimena izvedena od titula, Raskovnik 87–88 (proleće–zima 1997), Tematski zbornik Marko Kraljević, istorija, mit, legenda, Beograd 1998, 9–34.
 Mara Hrebeljanović, Danica 2000, Beograd 1999, 127–147.
 Gospodar – vladarska titula Ivana Crnojevića, Zapisi 3–4 (1999) 7–15.
 Dušanov zakonik u sudskoj praksi, Dušanov zakonik – 650 godina od njegovog donošenja, Banja Luka 2000, 35–50.
 Povelja kralja Stefana Tvrtka I Kotromanića knezu i vojvodi Hrvoju Vukčiću Hrvatiniću, Stari srpski arhiv (SSA) 1 (Beograd 2002) 117–129.
 Hrisovulja cara Uroša melničkom mitropolitu Kirilu, SSA 2 (2003) 85–97.
 Mljetske povelje cara Uroša, SSA 3 (2004) 71–87.
 Hrisovulja cara Uroša manastiru Hilandaru, SSA 4 (2005) 151–160.
 Hrisovulja cara Uroša manastiru Hilandaru o daru kaluđera Romana, SSA 5 (2006) 139–148.
 Slovo braće Brankovića manastiru Hilandaru, SSA 6 (2007) 151–166 (co-author with Irena Špadijer).
 Povelja Stefana Ostoje Dubrovčanima, Građa o prošlosti Bosne (GPB) 1 (Banja Luka 2008) 123–135.
 Povelja kralja Ostoje kojom potvrđuje ranije darovnice Dubrovniku, SSA 7 (2008) 163–173)

References

External links 
 Biography on the website of ANURS

20th-century Serbian historians
Yugoslav historians
Serbs of Bosnia and Herzegovina
People from Gradiška, Bosnia and Herzegovina
Members of the Academy of Sciences and Arts of the Republika Srpska
1937 births
2020 deaths
Serbian medievalists